The Italian general election of 1983 took place on 26 June 1983.

In Veneto Christian Democracy was, as usual, the largest party with 42.5% of the vote. Liga Veneta won for the first time seats in the Italian Parliament.

Results

Chamber of Deputies
Source: Regional Council of Veneto

Provincial breakdown
Source: Regional Council of Veneto

Senate
Source: Regional Council of Veneto

Elections in Veneto
General, Veneto